The canton of Saint-Rémy is an administrative division of the Saône-et-Loire department, eastern France. It was created at the French canton reorganisation which came into effect in March 2015. Its seat is in Saint-Rémy.

It consists of the following communes:
 
La Charmée
Épervans
Lux
Marnay
Saint-Loup-de-Varennes
Saint-Marcel
Saint-Rémy
Sevrey
Varennes-le-Grand

References

Cantons of Saône-et-Loire